E. utilis  may refer to:
 Ecdysanthera utilis, a shrub species now known as Urceola micrantha
 Episimus utilis, a moth species native to Brazil

See also
 Utilis (disambiguation)